Maycon Lucas Nogueira Mansano (born 28 July 1994), commonly known as Maycon or Maycon Canário, is a Brazilian footballer who currently plays as a midfielder for PAEEK.

Career statistics

Club

Notes

References

1994 births
Living people
Brazilian footballers
Brazilian expatriate footballers
Association football forwards
Campeonato Brasileiro Série D players
Liga Portugal 2 players
Club Athletico Paranaense players
Foz do Iguaçu Futebol Clube players
Esporte Clube Internacional de Lages players
Atlético Clube Paranavaí players
Paraná Clube players
Maringá Futebol Clube players
Associação Portuguesa de Desportos players
Varzim S.C. players
PAEEK players
Brazilian expatriate sportspeople in Portugal
Expatriate footballers in Portugal